The Escort Cup or Escort Championships was a national club-based Australian rules football competition that was held between 1979 and 1982.

Club teams from the Victorian Football League (VFL), West Australian Football League (WAFL) and the South Australian National Football League (SANFL) competed in the competition, along with combined sides from Tasmania, New South Wales, Australian Capital Territory and Queensland.

The competition is remembered as having games between teams from different states that wore the same jumper, resulting in one-off alternative or clash strips being worn, a concept that was not necessary in normal league games.  The Collingwood and South Fremantle Football Clubs both wore clash strips in their respective games against Swan Districts and the Sydney Swans. They both lost a coin toss to decide who would retain their normal jumper and who would change.

In June 1982, Swan Districts sent a junior team to play Richmond in protest to the date of their semi-final match being changed without consultation.  In response, they were banned from competing in the national cup competition for the next two years.

Competing teams

Grand Final results
Despite teams from all major leagues being involved in the competition, only teams from the Victorian Football League played in the four grand finals.

References

Australian rules football competitions in Australia